A lota is a type of spouted globular (round), small-sized vessel made of brass, copper or plastic used in the Indian subcontinent since at least the 2nd millennium BC. In Dharmic religions, the copper lota has a sacred usage, such as in a yagna ritual during puja prayers, weddings and other sacred ceremonies. According to the ancient Indian/Hindu-origin traditional medicine system of ayurveda, drinking water stored in the copper lota has health and nutritional benefits.

Its regional variations include bodna in the Bengali language and kindi in the state of Kerala.

Archaeology
Early examples of lota and kindi first appear in Chalcolithic period cultures of South Asia, notably in Savalda Culture and two well-preserved examples from Jorwe culture pottery dating back to 2nd millennium BC.

Design

Review and reactions
American designers Charles and Ray Eames in their The India Report expressed a great admiration for the lota, saying about its design, "Of all the objects we have seen and admired during our visit to India, the Lota, that simple vessel of everyday use, stands out as perhaps the greatest, the most beautiful."

Regional names and other variations
In West Bengal and parts of Bangladesh, the term bôdnā describes spouted (teapot-like) vessels, and the vessels used for puja are called ghôt or ghôti, while lotā is used for bath mugs, . In Odisha, vessels without the spout is also known as lota. They are also known as Jharis and Achaman Jharis (utensils with spouts) in Hindi Belt and Gujarat in northern and western India, used for prayer rituals.  It is also known as Mooku sombu and Pal Kindi used as milk feeder for babies in southern parts of India.

Usage

Idioms and literature
In some parts of South Asia, the use of the phrase "bependi ka lota" (a "lota without a base") is colloquially used to refer to a person who may switch their loyalties. This comes from the observation that a spherical lota without a base tends to roll over in unpredictable directions when kept on uneven ground. The neologism "lotacracy" was coined in Pakistan to describe politicians who would switch parties.

Health

According to the ancient Indian/Hindu-origin traditional medicine system of ayurveda, drinking water stored in the copper lota has health and nutritional benefits. It is used for Jala neti, a traditional Ayurvedic and Yogic practice that is used for cleansing the nose and sinus passages through nasal irrigation. Often popularly known as "Neti pot".

Holy rituals

In the Indian-origin religions, the lota is a multipurpose utensil. It is also used in the sacred rituals, such as yagna, puja prayers, wedding and other sacred ceremonies.

Ritual cleansing

In South Asia, the lota is employed to cleanse oneself.

In Bengali, the term lotā is used for bath mugs. People of the South Asia diaspora may use watering cans, empty bottles or cups for cleansing purpose. Muslims use lota for the istinja cleansing rituals, such as wudu, bath and anal cleansing.

See also 
 Aftabeh
 Ghatam or matka, a larger relative of the lota
 Islamic toilet etiquette
 Kalasha—the lota is a type of falsha

Citations

External links 

 Bodna Nai—Music video depicting the extinction of the bodna from urban Bangladesh
 The Lota Blog—A comedic blog about the use and application of the lota in modern times
 Nuevos Habitos—An artist dedicated to lota and other stuff
  - HOW TO USE A LOTA: THE SECRET TO ISLAMIC HYGIENE.

Drinkware
Indian culture
Liquid containers